Microtecnica S.r.l. is a main Italian aircraft component company (hydraulics), now owned by UTC of America.

History
The company was founded in 1929. It supplies equipment for helicopters and regional jet aircraft, such as the AgustaWestland AW101, the NHIndustries NH90 and Agusta A129 Mangusta. It supplied hydraulic actuation systems for the Panavia Tornado, such as the air intake control system, which it designed with Hawker Siddeley Dynamics, and the auxiliary power unit.

Ownership
In April 2011 the company was bought for 330 million euros.

Products
 Flight control actuation hydraulic systems
 Aircraft environmental control systems

References

Aircraft component manufacturers of Italy
Electrical engineering companies of Italy
Manufacturing companies established in 1929
United Technologies